Keelan Lawrence Cole Sr. (born April 20, 1993) is an American football wide receiver for the Las Vegas Raiders of the National Football League (NFL). He was signed by the Jacksonville Jaguars as an undrafted free agent after the 2017 NFL Draft. He played college football at Kentucky Wesleyan.

Early years
Cole attended and played high school football at Central High School in Louisville, Kentucky.

College career
Cole attended and played college football at Kentucky Wesleyan.

Professional career

Jacksonville Jaguars
On May 1, 2017, Cole was signed by the Jacksonville Jaguars as an undrafted free agent.

2017 season
On August 10, 2017, Cole played his first preseason game, catching a 97-yard touchdown pass against the New England Patriots.

On September 10, 2017, in the season opener, Cole made his regular season debut in a 29–7 victory over the Houston Texans. On September 17, 2017, in Week 2, he had the first two receptions of his career, which totaled 13 yards, in a 37–16 loss to the Tennessee Titans. On December 10, 2017, during Week 14 against the Seattle Seahawks, Cole finished with 99 receiving yards, including a 75-yard touchdown, as the Jaguars won 30–24. During a Week 15 win of 45–7 over the Houston Texans, Cole finished with an NFL-leading 186 receiving yards and a touchdown, including a 73-yard reception to the one-yard line. Overall, he finished his rookie season with 42 receptions for 748 receiving yards and three receiving touchdowns.

2018 season
In Week 2 of the 2018 season, Cole recorded seven receptions for 116 yards and a touchdown in the 31–20 victory over the New England Patriots. Overall, Cole finished the 2018 season with 38 receptions for 491 receiving yards and one receiving touchdown.

2019 season
In the 2019 season, Cole finished with 24 receptions for 361 receiving yards and three receiving touchdowns.

2020 season
On March 17, 2020, the Jaguars placed a second-round restricted free agent tender on Cole. He signed the one-year contract on April 23, 2020. In Week 6 against the Detroit Lions, he had six receptions for 143 receiving yards in the 34–16 loss.
In Week 10 against the Green Bay Packers, Cole recorded five catches for 47 yards and a receiving touchdown and returned a punt for a 91-yard touchdown during the 24–20 loss.

New York Jets

2021 season 
On March 19, 2021, Cole signed a one-year, $5.5 million contract with New York Jets.

Las Vegas Raiders
On May 12, 2022, Cole signed as free agent with Las Vegas Raiders. He was released on August 30, 2022. On September 6, 2022, Cole was re-signed to the practice squad. On September 13, 2022, Cole was signed to the active roster.

NFL career statistics

References

External links
 Las Vegas Raiders bio
 Kentucky Wesleyan Panthers bio

1993 births
Living people
Players of American football from Louisville, Kentucky
American football wide receivers
Kentucky Wesleyan Panthers football players
Jacksonville Jaguars players
New York Jets players
Las Vegas Raiders players